Muzammil Shah is a Pakistani cricketer. He made his first-class debut for Islamabad in the 2017–18 Quaid-e-Azam Trophy on 2 November 2017. He made his List A debut for Islamabad in the 2018–19 Quaid-e-Azam One Day Cup on 13 September 2018.

References

External links
 

1998 births
Living people
Pakistani cricketers
Place of birth missing (living people)
Islamabad cricketers